Sheykh Vali (also Romanized as Sheykh Valī, Shaikhwali, Sheikh Vali, and Shikhvali) is a village in Guney-ye Gharbi Rural District, Tasuj District, Shabestar County, East Azerbaijan Province, Iran. At the 2006 census, its population was 763, in 193 families.

References 

Populated places in Shabestar County